Meld or MELD may refer to:

Science, technology and engineering
 Molding (process), the process of manufacturing by shaping the material using a rigid frame
 Melting, the phase transition of a substance from a solid to a liquid
 Welding, a fabrication process that joins materials by fusion
 Meld (software), a computer program for viewing the differences between files
 Model for End-Stage Liver Disease, a scoring system
 Meld, a British Rail Class 55 locomotive

Arts and entertainment
 Meld (cards), a set of matching cards in card games
 Vulcan mind meld, in In Star Trek
 "Meld" (Star Trek: Voyager), an episode of the television series Star Trek: Voyager

Other uses
 Meld (horse), a thoroughbred racehorse

See also
 MELD (disambiguation)
 Melding (disambiguation)
 Merge (disambiguation)